Reinilde Van Moer (born 21 November 1956 in Willebroek) is a Belgian politician and is affiliated to the N-VA. She was elected as a member of the Belgian Chamber of Representatives in 2010.

Notes

1956 births
Living people
Members of the Chamber of Representatives (Belgium)
New Flemish Alliance politicians
People from Willebroek
21st-century Belgian politicians
21st-century Belgian women politicians